Lakewood is a village in Preston Township, Wayne County, Pennsylvania, United States. The Preston Township Municipal Building, the township's only school, Preston Area School, and the Northern Wayne Community Library, part of the Wayne Library Alliance, are both located within the community.

There are also multiple summer camps in the community, including Camp Ramah, Camp Morasha, Camp Weequahic, Camp Nesher, and Camp Lavi.

The Preston Area School has a student enrollment of approximately 190 from grades K-8. The school also acts as a community center. The school has 28 full and part-time teachers, as well as a support staff of 10 members, and a parent–teacher organization.

References

Unincorporated communities in Wayne County, Pennsylvania
Unincorporated communities in Pennsylvania
Pocono Mountains